Roxane Duran (born 27 January 1993) is a French-Austrian actress. She appeared in the Palme d'Or-winning 2009 film The White Ribbon. She also acted in Le moine, a 2011 French-language film directed by Dominik Moll, an adaptation of Matthew Lewis's novel The Monk.

Early life and career
Duran made her professional theater debut at the age of 19 in a production of a play based on the life of Anne Frank written by Belgian playwright Éric-Emmanuel Schmitt.  Her father is of Spanish descent and her mother is of Austrian descent.
Duran is currently in the tv mini series Riviera, created by Neil Jordan with Julia Stiles, Iwan Rheon and Adrian Lester, produced by Sky Atlantic and to be aired summer 2017.

Filmography

Film

Television

Plays

References

External links
 

1993 births
Living people
Actresses from Paris
French people of Austrian descent
French people of Spanish descent
Austrian people of Spanish descent
French film actresses
French stage actresses
Austrian film actresses
Austrian stage actresses
21st-century French actresses
21st-century Austrian actresses
Cours Florent alumni